The 1936 North Carolina lieutenant gubernatorial election was held on November 3, 1936. Democratic nominee Wilkins P. Horton defeated Republican nominee J. Samuel White with 70.14% of the vote.

Primary elections
Primary elections were held on June 6, 1936.

Democratic primary

Candidates
Wilkins P. Horton, State Senator
Paul D. Grady, State Senator
George McNeill, businessman

Results

General election

Candidates
Wilkins P. Horton, Democratic
J. Samuel White, Republican

Results

References

1936
Gubernatorial
North Carolina